Louis Theodore Age, III (born February 1, 1970 in New Orleans, Louisiana) is a former American football offensive tackle who was a member of the Chicago Bears of the NFL in 1992.  He was selected in the 11th round of the 1992 NFL Draft out of the University of Louisiana at Lafayette.

References

External links
Pro-Football-Reference.com statistics

1970 births
Living people
St. Augustine High School (New Orleans) alumni
Players of American football from New Orleans
American football offensive tackles
Louisiana Ragin' Cajuns football players
Chicago Bears players
Barcelona Dragons players